In the 1995–96 season, MC Alger is competing in the National 1 for the 28th season, as well as the Algerian Cup. It is their 10th consecutive season in the top flight of Algerian football. They will be competing in National, and the Algerian Cup.

Squad list
Players and squad numbers last updated on 18 November 1995.Note: Flags indicate national team as has been defined under FIFA eligibility rules. Players may hold more than one non-FIFA nationality.

Pre-season

Competitions

Overview

Championnat National

League table

Matches

Algerian Cup

Algerian League Cup

Group B

Squad information

Appearances and goals

|-
! colspan=12 style=background:#dcdcdc; text-align:center| Goalkeepers

|-
! colspan=12 style=background:#dcdcdc; text-align:center| Defenders

|-
! colspan=12 style=background:#dcdcdc; text-align:center| Midfielders

|-
! colspan=12 style=background:#dcdcdc; text-align:center| Forwards

|-
! colspan=12 style=background:#dcdcdc; text-align:center| Players transferred out during the season

Goalscorers
Includes all competitive matches. The list is sorted alphabetically by surname when total goals are equal.

Transfers

In

Out

Notes

References

External links
 1995–96 MC Alger season at sebbar.kazeo.com 

MC Alger seasons
Algerian football clubs 1995–96 season